The Connaissance des temps (English: Knowledge of the Times) is an official yearly publication of astronomical ephemerides in France. Until just after the French Revolution, the title appeared as Connoissance des temps, and for several years afterwards also as Connaissance des tems.

Since 1984 it has appeared under the title Ephémérides astronomiques: Annuaire du Bureau des longitudes.

History 
Connaissance des temps is the oldest such publication in the world, published without interruption since 1679 (originally named La Connoissance des Temps ou calendrier et éphémérides du lever & coucher du Soleil, de la Lune & des autres planètes), when the astronomer Jean Picard (1620–1682) obtained from the King the right to create the annual publication. The first eight editors were:

1679–1684: Jean Picard (1620–1682)
1685–1701: Jean Le Fèvre (1650–1706)
1702–1729: Jacques Lieutaud (1660–1733)
1730–1734: Louis Godin (1704–1760)
1735–1759: Giovanni Domenico Maraldi (1709–1788)
1760–1775: Joseph Jérôme Lefrançois de Lalande (1732–1807)
1776–1787: Edme-Sébastien Jeaurat (1725–1803)
1788–1794: Pierre Méchain (1744–1804)

Other notable astronomers who edited the Connaissance des temps were:

Alexis Bouvard (1767–1843)
Bureau des Longitudes
Rodolphe Radau (1835–1911)
Marie Henri Andoyer (1862–1929)

Among the other prestigious national astronomical ephemerides, The Nautical Almanac was established in 1767 and the Berliner Astronomisches Jahrbuch in 1776.

Contents 
The volumes of the Connaissance des temps had two parts:
 a section of ephemerides, containing various tables
 articles giving a deeper coverage of various topics, often written by famous astronomers

References 

Lalande,

External links 
 Connaissance des Temps for the years 1679 to 1803
 Connaissance des Temps for the years 1804 to 1984
 Annuaire pour l'an ..., a popular version for the general public, for the years 1797 to 1969
 Ephémérides astronomiques: Annuaire du Bureau des longitudes for the years 1985 to 2004

Astronomical almanacs
Publications established in 1679
1679 establishments in France
Paris Observatory